Chokdee P.K.Saenchaimuaythaigym (โชคดี พี.เค.แสนชัยมวยไทยยิม) is a Thai Muay Thai fighter.

Titles and accomplishments

 World Muaythai Council 
 2018 WMC World Bantamweight Champion
Channel 7 Stadium
 2019 Channel 7 Fight of the Year (vs Suesat Paeminburi)

Fight record

|-  style="background:#fbb"
| 2022-06-22||Loss ||align=left| Yodsila Chor.Hapayak|| Muay Thai Palangmai, Rajadamnern Stadium || Bangkok, Thailand || Decision || 5 || 3:00
|-  style="background:#fbb"
| 2022-05-18|| Loss ||align=left| Yodsila Chor.Hapayak|| Muay Thai Palangmai, Rajadamnern Stadium || Bangkok, Thailand || Decision|| 5 ||3:00 
|- style="background:#fbb;"
|2022-01-16|| Loss || align="left" | Ekalak Sor.Samangarment || Channel 7 Stadium || Bangkok, Thailand|| Decision || 5 || 3:00 
|- style="background:#fbb;"
|2021-03-17||Loss|| align="left" | Mohawk Tded99 || Rangsit Stadium || Thailand|| Decision || 5 || 3:00
|- style="background:#fbb;"
|2020-11-22||Loss|| align="left" | Ekwayu Mor BangkokThonburi || Or.Tor.Gor 3 Stadium || Nonthaburi, Thailand|| TKO (Elbows) || 3 ||
|- style="background:#cfc;"
|2020-09-06||Win|| align="left" | Yodpetch Pangkongprap || Channel 7 Stadium || Bangkok, Thailand|| Decision || 5 || 3:00
|- style="background:#cfc;"
|2020-03-06||Win|| align="left" | Petchrapa Sor.Sopit || Kiatpetch, Lumpinee Stadium || Bangkok, Thailand|| Decision || 5 || 3:00
|- style="background:#fbb;"
|2019-11-07|| Loss || align="left" | Petchrapa Sor.Sopit || Ruamponkon Prachin || Prachinburi, Thailand|| Decision || 5 || 3:00
|- style="background:#fbb;"
|2019-08-25||Loss|| align="left" | Suesat Paeminburi|| Channel 7 Stadium || Bangkok, Thailand||Decision||5||3:00
|- style="background:#fbb;"
|2019-07-19||Loss|| align="left" | Petchsamarn Sor.Samarngarment || Muaymanwansuk + Kiatpetch, Lumpinee Stadium || Bangkok, Thailand|| TKO (Doctor Stop/Cut) ||3 ||
|-  style="background:#fbb;"
| 2019-05-10 || Loss ||align=left| Kompetch Sitsarawatsuer ||  Kiatpetch, Lumpinee Stadium || Bangkok, Thailand|| Decision || 5 || 3:00
|-
! style=background:white colspan=9 |
|-  style="background:#cfc;"
| 2019-03-26 || Win ||align=left| Petchphusang KelaSport || OneParunchai + Kiatpetch || Nakhon Si Thammarat, Thailand|| Decision  || 5 || 3:00
|-  style="background:#cfc;"
| 2019-02-11 || Win ||align=left| Kazuki Osaki || KNOCK OUT 2019 WINTER || Tokyo, Japan|| Decision (Unanimous) || 5 || 3:00
|-  style="background:#cfc;"
| 2019-01-06 || Win ||align=left| Superjeng Sor.SamarnGarment || Channel 7 Stadium || Bangkok, Thailand|| Decision  || 5 || 3:00
|-  style="background:#cfc;"
| 2018-09-23 || Win ||align=left| Yudai Sasaki || Muay Lok 2018 CHALLENGE || Tokyo, Japan|| KO (Left Hook) || 1 || 2:20
|-
! style=background:white colspan=9 |
|-  style="background:#c5d2ea;"
| 2018-08-19 || Draw||align=left| Satanfaa Moopingaroijoongbuey || Channel 7 Stadium || Bangkok, Thailand|| Decision  || 5 || 3:00
|-  style="background:#cfc;"
| 2018-07-08 || Win ||align=left| Mangkorntong Sakburiram || Channel 7 Stadium || Bangkok, Thailand|| KO || 3 ||
|-  style="background:#fbb;"
| 2018-03-22 || Loss ||align=left| Petchphusang KelaSport || || Thailand|| Decision  || 5 || 3:00
|-  style="background:#fbb;"
| 2018-02-13 || Loss ||align=left| Petkaowang Aesapasung  || Kiatpetch, Lumpinee Stadium || Bangkok, Thailand|| Decision  || 5 || 3:00
|-  style="background:#c5d2ea;"
| 2017-12-17 || Draw||align=left| Taiga Nakayama || The Battle Of Muaythai 16 || Yokohama, Japan|| Decision  || 5 || 3:00
|-  style="background:#fbb;"
| 2017-11-19 || Loss ||align=left| Jakdao Witsanukolkan  || Lumpinee Stadium || Bangkok, Thailand|| Decision  || 5 || 3:00
|-  style="background:#fbb;"
| 2017-09-05 || Loss ||align=left| Messi Pangkongprab || P.K.Saenchai, Lumpinee Stadium || Bangkok, Thailand|| Decision  || 5 || 3:00
|-  style="background:#fbb;"
| 2017-06-20 || Loss||align=left| Sprinter Pangkongprab  ||Kiatpetch, Lumpinee Stadium || Bangkok, Thailand|| Decision || 5 || 3:00
|-  style="background:#cfc;"
| 2017-05-23 || Win ||align=left| Teeto Hoywanpothchana || Lumpinee Stadium || Bangkok, Thailand|| KO (Left Hook)|| 2 ||
|-  style="background:#cfc;"
| 2017-03-07 || Win ||align=left| Sprinter Pangkongprab  || Lumpinee Champion + WanPranchai, Lumpinee Stadium || Bangkok, Thailand|| Decision || 5 || 3:00
|-  style="background:#cfc;"
| 2017-01-10 || Win ||align=left| Peankol Leknakhonsi  || Phetmuangnon, Lumpinee Stadium || Bangkok, Thailand|| Decision || 5 || 3:00
|-  style="background:#fbb;"
| 2016-11-29 || Loss ||align=left| Kaokarat Jitmuangnon  || Phetmuangnon, Lumpinee Stadium || Bangkok, Thailand|| Decision  || 5 || 3:00
|-  style="background:#cfc;"
| 2016-09-18 || Win ||align=left| Jakdao Witsanukolkan  || Channel 7 Stadium || Bangkok, Thailand|| Decision  || 5 || 3:00
|-  style="background:#cfc;"
| 2016-08-06 || Win||align=left| Petchphusang KelaSport ||Channel 7 Stadium || Bangkok, Thailand|| Decision  || 5 || 3:00
|-  style="background:#cfc;"
| 2016-06-05 || Win ||align=left| Kaokarat Jitmuangnon  || Komchadluek Stadium || Thailand|| KO (Left Hook)|| 3 ||
|-  style="background:#cfc;"
| 2016-04-26 || Win ||align=left| Ekwayu Mor.Krungthepthonburi  || Pumphanmuang, Lumpinee Stadium || Bangkok, Thailand|| Decision  || 5 || 3:00
|-  style="background:#cfc;"
| 2016-02-23 || Win ||align=left| Superjeng Peenaphat  || Kiatpetch, Lumpinee Stadium || Bangkok, Thailand|| Decision  || 5 || 3:00
|-  style="background:#fbb;"
| 2016-01-23 || Loss ||align=left| Superjeng Peenaphat  || Lumpinee Stadium || Bangkok, Thailand|| Decision  || 5 || 3:00
|-  style="background:#fbb;"
| 2015-06-05 || Loss ||align=left| Yodsila Fairtex  || Kirkkrai, Lumpinee Stadium || Bangkok, Thailand|| Decision  || 5 || 3:00
|-
| colspan=9 | Legend:

References

Chokdee PK.Saenchaimuaythaigym
Living people
1994 births